Bahag may refer to:
 Bahag (garment), a type of loincloth worn in the Philippines
 Simeon Kayyara or BaHaG (acronym for Baal Halachot Gedolot), 9th-century Jewish author

See also
 Bihag, a classical raga